Japananus is a genus of leafhoppers of the subfamily Deltocephalinae. Six species are currently placed in the genus, all native to Asia and typically feeding on Acer species. One species, J. hyalinus, has spread throughout the northern hemisphere and Australia with the trade in cultivated maples.

Species
 Japananus hyalinus (Osborn, 1900) - cosmopolitan by introduction
 Japananus aceri (Matsumura, 1914) - Japan, Korea, China.
 Japananus nepalicus Viraktamath & Anantha Murthy, 1999 - Nepal
 Japananus bicurvatus Xing, Dai et Li, 2008 - China
 Japananus meilingensis Xing, Dai et Li, 2010 - China
 Japananus lamellosus Xing, Dai et Li, 2010 - China

References 

Opsiini
Cicadellidae genera
Hemiptera of Asia